Mistake Bay is a waterway in Kivalliq Region, Nunavut, Canada. It is located in northwestern Hudson Bay by the old mining settlement and trading post of Tavani. Mistake Bay, to the south of Wilson Bay, has numerous islands and shoals. The mission Saint Francois Xavier was founded here in 1939 or 1940 by Father Dunleavy.

References

Bays of Kivalliq Region